The Archaeological Museum of Messenia is located in Kalamata, the capital of Messenia in southern Greece.

The museum is built on the site of the city's old market hall. Among else its collection includes the finds which were formerly kept in the Benakeion Archaeological Museum of Kalamata, a remarkable 1742 building of Venetian architecture which collapsed during the 1986 earthquake. The new museum holds antiquities from Messenia from prehistoric and Mycenaean times to the Byzantine and Latin eras, divided along the four geographic areas that traditionally made up Messenia: Kalamata, Messene, Pylia and Triphylia.

External links

 newsrelease 27 July 2007 Το Αρχαιολογικό Μουσείο Μεσσηνίας θα περιλαμβάνει ουσιαστικά όλα τα ευρήματα που εκτίθενται στο Μπενάκειο της Καλαμάτας και πολλά ακόμη, που έχουν προκύψει από πάμπολες ανασκαφές των τελευταίων χρόνων. Transl: The Archaeological Museum of Messenia will include all the finds which are displayed in the Benakeion (Archaeological Museum) of Kalamata and many more which are the result of numerous excavations of the last years.
www.messinia-guide.gr on the Benakeion
Ministry of Culture on the Benakeion
 Ministry of Culture on the Benakeion Από 24 Νοεμβρίου 2008 διακόπτεται η λειτουργία του Μουσείου λόγω μεταφοράς των εκθεμάτων του στο Αρχαιολογικό Μουσείο Μεσσηνίας. Transl: From 24 November 2008 the functioning of the museum is interrupted due to the transfer of the displays in the Archaeological Museum of Messenia
 newsrelease www.arxaiologia.gr 18 June 2009

Messenia
Kalamata